Paul A. Esposito is an American politician.

He was first elected to Connecticut's 148th House of Representatives district as a Democratic Party candidate in 1982, defeating M. William Greaney in the general election. Esposito lost reelection to Richard Cunningham in 1984.

References

Living people
Year of birth missing (living people)
20th-century American politicians
Democratic Party members of the Connecticut House of Representatives